ŠK Lozorno is a Slovak football team, based in the town of Lozorno. The club was founded in 1922.

Notable players
Had international caps for their respective countries. 
 	
 Kamil Susko

External links 
at futbalvregione.sk

References

Football clubs in Slovakia
SK Lozorno
Association football clubs established in 1922
1922 establishments in Slovakia